Aloe cameronii is a species of the genus Aloe indigenous to Malawi and Zimbabwe.

References

cameronii
Flora of Malawi
Flora of Mozambique
Plants described in 1903